Boca Teacapan (Tecapan Mouth) is the outlet of the Estero de Teacapán (Tecapan Estuary) that drains two large coastal lagoons, Agua Grande Lagoon in Sinaloa and Agua Brava Lagoon in Nayarit to the Pacific Ocean. It forms part of the border between the Escuinapa Municipality of Sinaloa, and Nayarit in Mexico.  

Boca Teacapan, lies 22.5 miles southeast of the Baluarte River and 44.5 miles southeast of Mazatlan.  The mouth is marked by a light. A continuously breaking bar fronts the entrance and extends up to about 2 miles offshore. The lagoons are accessible only by small craft. Anchorage can be taken off the entrance, about 0.8 mile seaward of the outer edge of the bar.

References

External links
  Marine World Database: Boca Tecapan
  By Serge Dedina, The Race to Kill Baja and the Sea of Cortez

Landforms of Sinaloa
Bodies of water of Mexico